Maroons Football Club also known as Prisons Football Club, is a Ugandan football club from Kampala owned by Uganda Prisons Service, currently playing in the FUFA Big League. Playing as Prisons FC, the club won the first two editions of the Ugandan Premier League

History
Prisons FC won the first two Ugandan Super League titles in 1968 and 1969, and were the first team to represent Uganda in international competition in the 1970 African Cup of Champions Clubs (a Ugandan team, Bitumastic, qualified in 1967 but withdrew before playing a match.)

The club declined during the 1980s and suffered their first relegation in 1987.

They were champions of the Second division of Ugandan football, the Ugandan Big League, three times in the 2010s, gaining promotion to the Ugandan Premier League each time. Their most recent promotion came in the 2017/2018 football season.

Honours
Ugandan Super League
Champion (2): 1968, 1969
FUFA Big League
Champion (3): 2010, 2015, 2017

Performance in CAF competitions
African Cup of Champions Clubs: 1 appearance
1970 – Quarter-finals

References

External links
Team profile – soccerway.com

Football clubs in Uganda
Works association football teams